Pierre Durand (15 December 1931 – 2 October 2016) was a French equestrian. He competed at the 1960 Summer Olympics and the 1972 Summer Olympics.

References

1931 births
2016 deaths
French male equestrians
Olympic equestrians of France
Equestrians at the 1960 Summer Olympics
Equestrians at the 1972 Summer Olympics
Sportspeople from Charente